George Charles Stewart Bain  (January 29, 1920  May 14, 2006) was a Canadian journalist, and the first to be named a national affairs correspondent at any Canadian newspaper. Bain was described by Allan Fotheringham as being  "the wittiest columnist ever to grace Ottawa," and Doug Fisher said that Bain was "the closest to the perfect columnist" and the columnist he tried to emulate.

Career

Born in Toronto, Ontario, he started with the Toronto Telegram at the age of sixteen, eventually becoming a general reporter and City Hall reporter. During World War II, he served with the Royal Canadian Air Force as a bomber pilot. After the war, in 1945, he joined The Globe and Mail as a general reporter for City Hall and Provincial Affairs in October 1945. He became a National Affairs reporter and columnist in 1952, and then served as a foreign correspondent in London (19571960) and Washington (19601964) before returning to the Ottawa bureau. From 1964 to 1969, he also appeared with Doug Fisher on Doug Fisher and ..., as well as Question Period on CJOH-TV.

Bain did not shy away from controversy in his writing. He was an early opponent of the War Measures Act when it was invoked by Pierre Trudeau as a response to the October crisis, and he later took Trudeau to task for swearing in the House of Commons and not being truthful about it afterward in what came to be known as the fuddle duddle incident. Trudeau, however, was the first to ask, "Where's Bain?" when Bain left the Globe for the Star in 1973.

In his column (which appeared five times a week in the Globe), he occasionally offered comic relief for his readers under the title of Letter from Lilac, ostensibly written by Clem Watkins, Jr. of Lilac, Saskatchewan (where the local branches of the Royal Canadian Legion and the Campaign for Nuclear Disarmament had a joint membership arrangement). He was characterized as "a rural Pepys reporting on the state of the nation." In one such letter, which was an allegory for the 1960s controversy over the unification of the Canadian Forces, Clem reported on the Lilac town council's move to unify its police, fire and ambulance services:

In 1973, he joined the Toronto Star, initially as an editorial page editor, and then as European correspondent (19741977), and Ottawa columnist (19771981). In 1981, he returned to The Globe and Mail to write a weekly column (and, from 1985, a monthly column for its Report on Business Magazine) which lasted until 1987, when he left after a protracted and bitter exchange with Editor-in-Chief Norman Webster. The Globe refused to print his final column, but Doug Fisher subsequently arranged to have it appear in the Toronto Sun. In it, he said:

He continued to write his "Media Watch" column for Maclean's, wine pieces for Toronto Life and enRoute, and weekly political commentary for The Chronicle Herald and The Mail-Star in Halifax, Nova Scotia.

In 1979, he became director of the School of Journalism at University of King's College. He retired in 1985, settling in Mahone Bay.

Family life

In 1944, he married Marion Jene Breakey. She died in 1998. They had one son, Christopher.

Honours

In 2000, he was made an Officer of the Order of Canada for having "contributed greatly to the development of journalism in Canada". He also received honorary degrees from Carleton University in 1983 and from University of King's College in 1986.

Bibliography
 
 , winner of the 1966 Stephen Leacock Memorial Medal for Humour

Notes

References

 
 
 
 
 George Bain  at The Canadian Encyclopedia

1920 births
2006 deaths
Journalists from Toronto
The Globe and Mail columnists
Canadian people of Scottish descent
Officers of the Order of Canada
Stephen Leacock Award winners
Royal Canadian Air Force personnel of World War II
Canadian expatriates in the United Kingdom
Canadian expatriates in the United States